Bargas is a municipality of Spain located in the province of Toledo, Castilla–La Mancha.

The municipality spans across a total area of 89.71 km2 and, as of 1 January 2020, it has a population of 10,535.

History 
Despite the ongoing Almoravid razzias in July 1117, Bargas' repopulation started by that time. The original urban settlement was called "Valdeolivas", and it was left forsaken. Bargas enjoys a strong bread-making tradition. French counterrevolutionaries arrived to the village in September 1792. The opening of the Madrid–Lisbon line in 1881 brought a rail connection to Bargas. A Socialist Casa del pueblo was opened in the village in 1907.

References
Citations

Bibliography

External links
 Official website of the municipality

Municipalities in the Province of Toledo